The 2014 La Flèche Wallonne was the 78th running of La Flèche Wallonne, a single-day cycling race. It was won for the second time by Spain's Alejandro Valverde, ahead of Ireland's Dan Martin and Poland's Michał Kwiatkowski.

Teams
As La Flèche Wallonne was a UCI World Tour event, all 18 UCI ProTeams were invited automatically and obligated to send a squad. Seven other squads were given wildcard places, thus completing the 25-team peloton.

The 25 teams that competed in the race were:

Results

References

External links

Fleche Wallonne
Fleche Wallonne
La Flèche Wallonne